The 2018 Marriott Hotels strike was a strike of more than 7,700 workers across the United States at 23 hotels operated by Marriott International in late 2018. The strike began in October and went through early December.

Strike 
Various professions across the hotel industry including housekeepers, cooks, servers, dishwashers, doormen, and concierges walked off the job as members of the Unite Here labor union. Their slogan was “One job should be enough", as a reference to the Fight for $15 movement in the service industry where employees are demanding a living wage. This walkout began in early October and spread to 23 Marriott hotels across the US to cities including San Francisco, Boston, Detroit, and Honolulu.

The strike ended and workers went back to work on December 5, 2018 after negotiations with Marriott.

As a result of the strike, housekeepers in San Francisco, whose median wage is $23 per hour, will receive a $4 per hour raise over the four year contract. Strikes in other cities also resulted in various new employment contracts that offered better wages and benefits, along with any workers who individually interact with guests to be receiving a silent GPS-enabled panic button for protection against sexual harassment in the workplace.

See also 

1912 New York City waiters' strike
Hotel workers rising

References 

Marriott International
Labor disputes in the United States
2018 labor disputes and strikes
UNITE HERE
Marriot